Charles Heyer Bell (August 15, 1798 – February 19, 1875) was a rear admiral in the United States Navy who served during the War of 1812, the Second Barbary War, and the American Civil War.

Biography
Born in New York, Bell served as a midshipman on Lake Ontario.

In 1824, he was in command of the schooner USS Ferret, which capsized at sea. He (and other survivors) remained with the capsized vessel for twenty-one hours before being rescued. Five crew members died.

In 1839 the brig Dolphin, under his command, ascended an African river and compelled a native chief to pay for goods that had been taken from a U.S. vessel. In the 1840s he commanded U.S. Navy ships in the suppression of the slave trade. He captured three slavers off the African coast, one of them transporting more than 900 slaves.

During the Mexican-American War he commanded a sloop-of-war named Yorktown along the African coast, to disrupt the slave trade.

At the beginning of the Civil War he was in command of the Mediterranean Squadron of the U.S. Navy.

On January 3, 1862 he was promoted to the newly established rank of Flag Officer (equivalent to the rank of Commodore) and he received command of the Pacific Squadron in July 1862 (replacing John B. Montgomery), which he held until 1864.

He was promoted to commodore on July 16, 1862, and in 1864 was transferred to the command of ships serving on the James River in Virginia. He was promoted to rear admiral on July 25, 1866. He retired in 1868, after serving for three years as commander of the Brooklyn Navy Yard. He died in New Brunswick, New Jersey in 1875 at the age of 76.

Dates of rank
Midshipman - 18 June 1812
Lieutenant - 28 March 1820
Commander - 10 September 1840
Captain - 12 August 1854
Flag Officer - 3 January 1862
Commodore, Retired List - 16 July 1862
Rear Admiral, Retired List - 25 July 1866
Died - 19 February 1875

Bibliography
 Url

References

External links

1798 births
1875 deaths
United States Navy rear admirals (lower half)
Burials at Elmwood Cemetery (North Brunswick, New Jersey)